Claire Haab (born 13 December 1989) is a French female canoeist who won five medals at senior level of the Wildwater Canoeing World Championships and European Wildwater Championships.

References

External links
 

1989 births
Living people
French female canoeists
Place of birth missing (living people)